Pajaro/Watsonville is a proposed train station on Caltrain and Amtrak California's Capitol Corridor trains to serve both Pajaro and Watsonville, California. The station is expected to open after track improvements in the area and service commences to Salinas as part of the Monterey County Rail Extension. It will be located in Watsonville Junction near the corner of Salinas Road and Lewis Road, adjacent to the former Southern Pacific Railroad depot and current Union Pacific Railroad office.

History
The Southern Pacific Railroad was built out to Pajaro by November 26, 1871. The railroad changed the name to Watsonville Junction in 1913 to aide travelers unfamiliar with Spanish pronunciation. A new station building was constructed in 1949.

The overnight passenger train The Lark stopped at Watsonville Junction between 1941 and 1968. The Del Monte served the old station until service was discontinued on April 30, 1971, the day before Amtrak took over intercity passenger train service in the United States. The 1949-built depot was demolished in 2011.

References

External links
 Monterey County Rail Extension Phase 2: Pajaro / Watsonville — Transportation Agency for Monterey County station planning

Railway stations in Monterey County, California
Future Caltrain stations
Amtrak stations in California
Future Amtrak stations in the United States
Former Southern Pacific Railroad stations in California
Railway stations in the United States opened in 1871
Railway stations closed in 1971